Tom O'Toole (born 23 September 1998) is an Irish rugby union player, currently playing for United Rugby Championship and European Rugby Champions Cup side Ulster. He plays as a tighthead prop.

Born in Drogheda, O'Toole lived in Ratoath, County Meath until he was six years of age before moving to Brisbane, Australia for ten years due to his father's work commitments, where he attended Padua College. He was selected for the Queensland Reds development side and Queensland Schoolboys in 2015, before being connected with the Irish Exiles setup. He moved to Campbell College in Northern Ireland which allowed him to link up with the Ulster and Ireland age grade setups, going on to play for Ireland at under-18, under-19 and under-20 level.

He joined the Ulster Rugby academy straight from school in 2017, and made his senior Ulster debut on 6 April 2018 in round 19 of the 2017–18 Pro14, starting in the provinces 32–20 away win against Scottish side Edinburgh. He made five senior appearances, including two starts, in the 2017–18 season, and won Academy Player of the Year at the 2018 Ulster Rugby Awards. He was awarded a development contract for the 2018–19 season, which would advance to a senior contract from the 2019–20 season until June 2022. during which he made 18 appearances, including 3 starts.

In the 2019–20 season he made 22 appearances, including ten starts, and was named Young Player of the Year in the Ulster Rugby Awards. He received his first call up to the senior Ireland squad on 15 January 2020 for the 2020 Six Nations Championship.

In 2020–21 he made fifteen appearances, including two starts, and made 141 tackes and one turnover. In June 2021 he was called up again to the senior Ireland squad for the Summer tests, and made his senior international debut in a 71–10 victory over the United States on 10 July 2021. In the 2021–22 season he has made 15 appearances, including eight starts, and appeared off the bench for Ireland in their 53–7 home win over Argentina in the 2021 Autumn internationals. He was called up to the Ireland squad for their 2022 tour of New Zealand. He was called up to Ireland's 2023 Six Nations Championship squad coming off the bench in all 5 matches as Ireland won the championship and Grand Slam.

References

External links

Ulster Rugby profile
United Rugby Championship profile
Ireland Profile

1998 births
Living people
Irish rugby union players
Ulster Rugby players
Rugby union props
Ireland international rugby union players